Kotowice  is a village in the administrative district of Gmina Siechnice, within Wrocław County, Lower Silesian Voivodeship, in south-western Poland.

The village has a population of 660.

The village contains a small railroad station. It connects the village with Wrocław, Siechnice, and Jelcz-Laskowice.

The village is one of the place that suffered during the great flood in 1997. 

In 2012, Kotowice opened an observation tower. The tower is 40 meters high.

References

Villages in Wrocław County